Daisy Granados (born 9 December 1942) is a Cuban film actress. She has appeared in more than 40 films since 1964. At the 11th Moscow International Film Festival in 1979, she won the award for Best Actress for her role in Portrait of Teresa. In 1985, she was a member of the jury at the 14th Moscow International Film Festival. She was married to writer/director Pastor Vega until his death in Havana, Cuba.

Partial filmography

 La decisión (1964)
 Tulipa (1967)
 Memories of Underdevelopment (1968) - Elena
 The Challenges (1969) - Floritica (segment 3)
 Páginas del diario de José Martí (1972)
 Portrait of Teresa (1979) - Teresa
 Son o no son (1980)
 Cecilia (1982) - Cecilia
 Habanera (1984) - Laura
 A Successful Man (1986) - Rita
 Amor en campo minado (1987)
 A Very Old Man with Enormous Wings (1988) - Elisenda
 Demasiado miedo a la vida o Plaff (1988) - Concha
 Lágrimas al desayuno (1989, Short) - Vicenta Barnet
 Wenn du groß bist, lieber Adam (1990) - Caroline
 Palabras de mujer (1990, Short) - Vicenta Barnet
 María Antonia (1990) - Nena Capitolio
 La soledad de la jefa de despacho (1990, Short)
 Tirano Banderas (1993) - Doña Rosita Pintado
 Vidas paralelas (1993)
 Sueño Tropical (1993)
 El elefante y la bicicleta (1994) - Da. Mercedes, La gitana
 Things I Left in Havana (1997) - María
 Rizo (1998) - Madame Floria
 Cuarteto de La Habana (1999) - Nereida
 Las profecías de Amanda (1999) - Amanda
 Un paraíso bajo las estrellas (2000) - Mabel
 Nothing More (2001) - Cunda
 Rosa la China (2002) - Rita
 Solamente una vez (2002)
 @Festivbercine.ron (2004)
 90 millas (2005) - Josefa
 Bienvenido/Welcome 2 (2006)
 Meteoro (2006) - Madame
 Mujeres en el Acto (2006)
 No Mercy (2008, TV Movie) - Irene
 The Condemned (2012) - Magdalena
 7 Days in Havana (2012) - Delia (segment "El Yuma")
 Esther en alguna parte (2013) - Maruja
 Forbidden Flights (2015) - Graciela
 Habana Selfies (2019)

References

External links

1942 births
Living people
Cuban film actresses
People from Cienfuegos
20th-century Cuban actresses